Kamarupi script (Kamrupi script, ancient Assamese script) was the script used in ancient Kamarupa from as early as 5th century to 13th century, from which the modern Assamese script eventually evolved. In the development of the Assamese script, this phase was followed by the medieval and then by the modern Assamese scripts.

Though the script development was in general agreement with the development in Bengal and Bihar, it had local peculiarities. The angular and calligraphic style of writing prevalent to its west is not found in this development.

History
The Kamarupi script originated from Gupta script, which in turn developed from Brahmi script. It developed on its own in Kamarupa, till the Nidhanpur copper-plate issued by Bhaskarvarman from his military camp at Karnasubarna, which took on Kutila characteristics. Sometimes, Kamarupi script origins are traced to Kutila script, which is not widely accepted.

The Kamarupa inscriptions were engraved during this development period, and they display the development of this script in this period. The scripts of the 5th-century Umachal and Nagajari-Khanikargaon rock inscriptions are nearly identical to the eastern variety of the Gupta script, which over the centuries evolved into the proto-Assamese script of the 12th-century Kanai-Boroxiboa inscriptions.

S. N. Sarma has observed that the Assamese script pertaining to the period from the 6th century to the twelfth century can be termed as the ancient Kamrupi script. The Kamrupi script took the form of the old Assamese script in the latter period.

Descendants
In late medieval period, three variations surfaced namely: (1) "Gargaya" used around Gargaon, (2) "Bamonia" used in preparation of Sanskrit texts, used by Brahmins, (3) "Kaitheli" used by the Kayasthas and called "Lakhri" in Kamrup.

See also
 Kamarupi Prakrit

References

Bibliography

 
 
 
 

Gupta scripts
Brahmic scripts
Kamrupi culture
Linguistic history of India